The 1999 Hungarian Grand Prix (formally the XV Marlboro Magyar Nagydíj) was a Formula One motor race held on 15 August 1999 at the Hungaroring in Mogyoród, Pest, Hungary. It was the eleventh race of the 1999 FIA Formula One World Championship.

The 77-lap race was won from pole position by Mika Häkkinen, driving a McLaren-Mercedes. Häkkinen's teammate David Coulthard finished second, while Drivers' Championship rival Eddie Irvine finished third in his Ferrari. The top six was completed by Heinz-Harald Frentzen in the Jordan, Rubens Barrichello in the Stewart, and Damon Hill in the other Jordan.

The win, Häkkinen's fourth of the season, moved him to within two points of Irvine in the Drivers' Championship, while McLaren reduced Ferrari's lead in the Constructors' Championship to four points.

Classification

Qualifying

Race

Championship standings after the race

Drivers' Championship standings

Constructors' Championship standings

References

Hungarian Grand Prix
Hungarian Grand Prix
Grand Prix
Hungarian Grand Prix